Carbon Stereoxide (stylized as CarbonStereoxide) is the seventh and final studio album by Filipino alternative rock band Eraserheads. Released in March 2001 by BMG Records (Pilipinas), Inc., it is the band's last album featuring Ely Buendia as lead singer.

Carbon Stereoxide was first released in both CD and cassette formats, and included a bonus VCD featuring the making of the music video for "Maskara" video as well behind-the-scenes footage and interviews. Initial copies also came with a promotional Eraserheads "masks" set.

Background 
Following several performances and shows across Asia to promote the compilation album Aloha Milkyway (1998), Eraserheads released their sixth studio album Natin99 (1999). It sold 20,000 copies across the Philippines, earning a gold certification from the Philippine Association of the Record Industry (PARI).

Reception 

The album was poorly received by critics upon release. In their review, Baby Gil of The Philippine Star wrote: "Carbon Stereoxide finds the Eraserheads at the crossroads." She added that the album's guitar and drums "get too loud in the wrong places at times, but take note, they are real", in comparison to band's style from the preceding album.

David Gonzales of AllMusic regarded Carbon Stereoxide as "another bewildering mess". While he considered the album's first two opening tracks ("Ultrasound" and "Maskara") as "good alternative rock songs", he pointed out that these songs will fail to appeal to a wide range of listeners. Gonzales dismissed most of the album as "pointless and meandering".

Commercial performance 
Carbon Stereoxide sold 12,000 copies in the Philippines, making it the least successful album by the band in terms of sales.

Track listing

Personnel
Credits adapted from liner notes.

Eraserheads
 Ely Buendia - vocals, guitars, back-up vocals (3, 5, 14), Tibetan monx (14), cover and Sagada photos
 Buddy Zabala - bass, guitars, back-up vocals (3, 5, 14), Tibetan monx (14)
 Marcus Adoro - guitars, vocals (5, 16)
 Raimund Marasigan - drums, guitars, percs (13, 16-17), back-up vocals (3, 9), filler (13, 17), vocals (11), additional beats (12), loops (13)

Album Credits 
 Robin Rivera - production, backing vocals (3, 5, 14), percs (13, 16, 17), Tibetan monx (14)
 Eraserheads - production
 Rudy Tee - executive producer
 Angee Rozul - engineering, art direction
 Buboy - engineering
 Vic Valenciano - A&R
 Diane D. Cute - band photographer
 Cynthia Bauzon - sleeve art direction
 Zach - percs (13, 16, 17)
 Mica - ice cream (5)

References 

2001 albums
Eraserheads albums